RNA binding motif protein 9 (RBM9), also known as Rbfox2, is a protein which in humans is encoded by the RBM9  gene.

Function 

Rbfox2  is one of several human genes similar to the C. elegans gene Fox-1. This gene encodes an RNA binding protein that is thought to be a key regulator of alternative splicing in the nervous system and other cell types. Rbfox2 and the related protein Rbfox1 bind to conserved (U)GCAUG RNA motifs in the introns adjacent to many alternatively spliced exons and promotes inclusion or exclusion of the alternative exon in mature transcripts. The protein also interacts with the estrogen receptor 1 transcription factor and regulates estrogen receptor 1 transcriptional activity. Multiple transcript variants encoding different isoforms have been found for this gene.

Rbfox2, as determined by CLIP-seq, binds near alternatively spliced exons and regulates the inclusion or exclusion of exons during alternative splicing by binding in introns either downstream (inclusion) or upstream (exon skipping) of exons.  Its presence is important for stem cell survival and knockdowns of Rbfox2 activate markers for apoptosis.

See also 
Alternative splicing
RNA-binding protein

References

Further reading

External links